Oxnerella is a genus of centrohelid.

It includes the species Oxnerella maritima.

References

Hacrobia genera